The Coimbatore–Mettupalayam branch line connects  and  in Tamil Nadu.

History

The Coimbatore–Mettupalayam dual gauge  broad-gauge,  line was opened to traffic in 1873.  The Coimbatore–Mettupalayam section was converted to complete broad gauge in 1907. Dual gauge was retained between Podanur (PTJ), Coimbatore_Junction (CBE) and Coimbatore_North_Junction (CBF).,

Electrification
  
The electrification of Coimbatore–Mettupalayam branch line was completed in 2015.

Passenger movement

Stations like Coimbatore, Coimbatore North,  are on this line. Suburban areas are connected by this line.

References

External links
Trains at Coimbatore Main

5 ft 6 in gauge railways in India
Rail transport in Tamil Nadu